The 37th Karlovy Vary International Film Festival took place from 4 to 13 July 2002. The Crystal Globe was won by Year of the Devil, a Czech mockumentary film directed by Petr Zelenka. The second prize, the Special Jury Prize was won by Nowhere in Africa, a German historical film directed by Caroline Link. French American film actor and director Jean-Marc Barr was the president of the jury.

Juries
The following people formed the juries of the festival:
Main competition
 Jean-Marc Barr, Jury President (France)
 Bibiana Beglau (Germany)
 Roger Ebert (USA)
 Ibolya Fekete (Hungary)
 Jan Malíř (Czech Republic)
 Kaynam Myung (South Korea)
 Asumpta Serna (Spain)
Documentaries
 Andrej Plachov, president (Russia)
 Andrej Kalpakči (Ukraine)
 Pavel Koutecký (Czech Republic)
 Nosha van der Lely (Netherlands)
 David Franca Mendes (Brazil)

Official selection awards

The following feature films and people received the official selection awards:
 Crystal Globe (Grand Prix) - Year of the Devil (Rok ďábla) by Petr Zelenka (Czech Republic)
 Special Jury Prize - Nowhere in Africa (Nirgendwo in Afrika) by Caroline Link (Germany)
 Best Director Award - Asghar Massombagi for Khaled (Canada)
 Best Actress Award - Ugla Egilsdóttir for her role in The Seagull's Laughter (Mávahlátur) (Iceland)
 Best Actor Award - William H. Macy for his role in Focus (USA)
 Special Jury Mention - Let's Not Cry by Boung-hun Min (South Korea) & Smoking Room by Roger Gual, Julio D. Wallovits (Spain)

Other statutory awards
Other statutory awards that were conferred at the festival:
 Best documentary film (over 30 min.) - Enan no musume (en. Daughter from Yan'an) by Kaoru Ikeya (Japan)
 Special Jury Mention - Devil's Playground by Lucy Walker (USA) & Andrey Belyy. Okhota na angela, ili Chetyre lyubvi poeta i proritsatelya (en. Hunting Down an Angel, or Four Passions of the Soothsayer Poet) by Andrey Osipov (Russia)
 Best documentary film (under 30 min.) - Obec B. (en. Village B.) by Filip Remunda (Czech Republic)
 Crystal Globe for Outstanding Artistic Contribution to World Cinema - John Boorman (UK), Vlastimil Brodský (Czech Republic), Sean Connery (UK)
 Award of the Town of Karlovy Vary - Michael York (UK)
 Audience Award - L'Auberge Espagnole by Cédric Klapisch (France, Spain)

Non-statutory awards
The following non-statutory awards were conferred at the festival:
 FIPRESCI International Critics Award: Nowhere in Africa (Nirgendwo in Afrika) by Caroline Link (Germany)
 Special Mention: Let's Not Cry by Boung-hun Min (South Korea)
 FICC - The Don Quixote Prize: Bedtime Fairy Tales for Crocodiles (Cuentos de hadas para dormir cocodrilos) by Ignacio Ortíz Cruz (Mexico)
 Ecumenical Jury Award: Cisza (en. Silence) by Michal Rosa (Poland)
 Special Mention: Filament (Firamento) by Hitonari Tsuji (Japan)
 Philip Morris Film Award: Sisters (Syostry) by Sergei Bodrov, Jr. (Russia)
 NETPAC Award: The Coast Guard (Haeanseon) Kim Ki-duk (South Korea)

References

2002 film awards
Karlovy Vary International Film Festival